De-Sukarnoization, also spelled de-Soekarnoization, was a purging policy that existed in Indonesia from the transition to the New Order in 1966 up to the beginning of the Reformation era in 1998, in which President Suharto intended to defame his predecessor Sukarno as well as lessen his presence and downplay his role in Indonesian history.

History
In 1965, Sukarno still enjoyed the Indonesian people's sympathy, but for Suharto to take that place, he had to downplay Sukarno's importance to the Indonesians. The de-Sukarnoization process started in 1967 after the Provisional People's Consultative Assembly (MPRS) stripped Sukarno of his presidential powers and put him under house arrest. While in custody, Sukarno was denied access to health care, which led to his death in 1970. Suharto denied Sukarno's request to be buried in Istana Batu Tulis in Bogor; instead, Sukarno was buried in Blitar, a city that former governor said as his birthplace. Suharto is said to have feared that if his predecessor's grave had been located in Bogor it could become a focal point for fomenting opposition to his New Order.

The New Order renamed many places that had been named after Sukarno: Gelora Bung Karno Sports Complex was renamed the "Senayan Sports Complex", the Bung Karno Bridge was renamed Ampera Bridge; the city "Sukarnapura" (Sukarno City) was renamed "Jayapura" and "Puncak Sukarno" (Sukarno Peak) was renamed "Puncak Jaya". The only monument that was renamed back to the original name after the fall of Suharto was the Senayan Sports Complex, whereas the latter places retained the names given during the New Order.

Other efforts to reduce Sukarno's influence included denying his major contribution in creating the Indonesian national ideology, Pancasila. Military historian Nugroho Notosusanto instead posed that Mohammad Yamin came up first with the principles of Pancasila, while Sukarno was merely the first to use the term. This interpretation was supported by the New Order government and became the official historical interpretation taught at schools.

References

History of Indonesia
New Order (Indonesia)
Political and cultural purges
Sukarno